James Dunn (25 November 1900 – 20 August 1963) was a Scottish international footballer, most famous for being part of the 1928 Wembley Wizards team.

Club career
Dunn, born in Glasgow and nicknamed "ginger"  due to the colour of his hair, started his senior career in 1920 when Hibernian signed him from his local Junior side St Anthony's. He stayed eight years with the Edinburgh club (304 matches, 103 goals in the Scottish Football League and Scottish Cup) helping them to consecutive Scottish Cup finals in 1923 and 1924, although he collected a runners-up medal on each occasion.

Dunn joined Everton immediately after his Wembley escapades and played with the Merseyside club for the next 7 seasons. He won a Second Division championship and Football League championship with the Toffees in consecutive seasons (1931 and 1932) and was part of their FA Cup winning side of 1933, scoring in the final itself.

After scoring 49 goals in 155 matches for Everton, he left Goodison Park in 1935 for Exeter City, becoming the Grecians record signing in the process. He joined Runcorn the following year before retiring into a coaching role.

International career
In 1925, Dunn earned his first selection for the Scottish national team, playing in a 3–1 defeat of Wales at Tynecastle. He gained a further 4 Scotland caps while with Hibs, the most memorable being the last, against England at Wembley in 1928.

Dunn was a late inclusion in the side for the British Home Championship match, having missed selection for the preceding international trial match between home-based and Anglo-Scots. The entire Scotland forward-line measured 5 foot 7 or less and it was widely expected that the bigger, stronger English side would overpower their Scottish opponents. Dunn and his colleagues thought otherwise and raced to a surprise 5–1 victory, a record Scottish win at Wembley. The victory was widely celebrated in Scotland and the team was later somewhat mythologised as the Wembley Wizards.

While at Everton, Dunn gained one further cap, again against Wales.

Personal life
His son, Jimmy Jr, would later also find fame on the football field, participating in Wolverhampton Wanderers' victorious 1949 FA Cup team.

Dunn's great-great-nephew is footballer Alex Harris.

Honours
Everton
Football League First Division: 1931–32
FA Cup: 1930–33
Football League Second Division: 1930–31

References

External links 
 Profile at Hibs Historical Trust

1900 births
1963 deaths
Footballers from Glasgow
Scottish footballers
Scotland international footballers
Scottish Football League players
English Football League players
Hibernian F.C. players
Everton F.C. players
Exeter City F.C. players
Scottish Football League representative players
St Anthony's F.C. players
Scottish Junior Football Association players
Association football inside forwards
Scotland junior international footballers
FA Cup Final players